Casasola may refer to:
 Casasola, Italy
 Casasola, Spain
 Agustín Casasola, Mexican photographer (1874-1938).